Columbia Park was a baseball field in Altoona, Pennsylvania, which was the home field for the Altoona Mountain Citys of the Union Association (UA) during the league's only season in . 

The longest UA game by innings played was played on May 27, 1884, in Columbia Park, with the Mountain Citys beating the Baltimore Monumentals by a score of 3–2 in 13 innings.

The ballpark, which was also sometimes called Fourth Avenue Grounds, was located at Lower Sixth Street, Fourth Avenue, and Mill Run Road.[Ballparks of North America, Michael Benson, McFarland Publishing, 1989, p.5-6]

References

Defunct baseball venues in the United States
Baseball venues in Pennsylvania
1884 establishments in Pennsylvania
Sports venues completed in 1884
Altoona, Pennsylvania
Defunct sports venues in Pennsylvania